The Bayer designation Theta Microscopii (θ Mic / θ Microscopii) is shared by two star systems, in the constellation Microscopium:
θ1 Microscopii, an A7 main sequence star
θ2 Microscopii, a multiple star

Microscopium, Theta
Microscopium